Savitri Shyam (2 May 1918 – 28 November 1989) was an Indian politician. She was elected to the Lok Sabha, lower house of the Parliament of India from Aonla, Uttar Pradesh as member of the Indian National Congress. She was defeated in 1977  by  Brij Raj Singh.

Shyam died on 28 November 1989, at the age of 71.

References

External links
Official Biographical Sketch in Lok Sabha Website

1918 births
1989 deaths
India MPs 1967–1970
India MPs 1971–1977
Lok Sabha members from Uttar Pradesh
People from Muzaffarnagar
People from Bareilly district
Indian National Congress politicians from Uttar Pradesh